Makhachkala Urban Okrug is an urban okrug in Republic of Dagestan, Russia. It was established on 13 January 2005. The administrative center is Makhachkala.

References

Urban okrugs of Russia